Annabella Avery Thorne (born October 8, 1997) is an American actress, singer, and writer. She first received recognition for her roles as Margaux Darling in the series Dirty Sexy Money (2007–2008) and as Ruthy Spivey in the drama series My Own Worst Enemy (2009), the latter of which earned her a Young Artist Award.

Thorne gained prominence for her role as CeCe Jones on the Disney Channel series Shake It Up (2010–2013), for which she received several awards and nominations, including winning an Imagen Award. Thorne has since appeared in numerous feature films, including Blended (2014), Alvin and the Chipmunks: The Road Chip (2015), The Babysitter film series (2017–2020). She received praise for her roles in The DUFF (2015), Amityville: The Awakening (2017), and Infamous (2020). Thorne also led the drama series Famous in Love (2017–2018), for which she received nominations from the Teen Choice Awards.

Outside of acting, Thorne has ventured into music; she released her debut single, "Watch Me" in 2011, which charted at 86 on the US Billboard Hot 100. She has since released the EP Made in Japan in 2012 and the EP Jersey in 2014. She made her directorial debut in 2019, directing the adult film Her & Him, which garnered her a mixed reception, although she won a Pornhub Visionary Award.

Early life
Annabella Avery Thorne was born in Pembroke Pines, Florida, on October 8, 1997, the daughter of Tamara Thorne and Delancey Reinaldo "Rey" Thorne. She has three siblings who are also actors. Her father was of Cuban descent, and she also has Italian, along with English, German, Irish, and Welsh ancestry. Her father died in a traffic accident in April 2007. She has said that she was raised by a mother who was supporting four children, that they were very poor, and that she originally began working as a child actress to help support the family.

In September 2017, Thorne revealed that she had lived in a suburban area, spoke Spanish as her first language, and that she was bullied while growing up because she was dyslexic. She was diagnosed with dyslexia while in first grade. She was home-schooled after previously attending a public school, where she had been bullied. She improved in her learning after attending a Sylvan Learning center and began reading and writing a grade ahead. In April 2010, she said she had overcome dyslexia by rigorously reading everything she could find, including cereal box labels.

In January 2018, Thorne wrote on Instagram that she had been physically and sexually abused as a child, "from the day I can remember till I was 14". In 2019, she told ABC News' Juju Chang that the abuse began when she was six years old. She did not name her alleged abuser, but said that he was "someone I was raised with".

Career

2003–2009: Early work and acting beginnings 
Thorne's first film appearance was an uncredited role as a sidelines fan in the 2003 film Stuck on You. She has since appeared in film and television projects including Entourage and The O.C. as a younger version of Taylor Townsend. In 2007, she joined the recurring cast of Dirty Sexy Moneys second season as Margaux Darling. This is her first major television role. The series revolves around lawyer and family man Nick George when Nick's father mysteriously dies in a plane crash, he agrees to take his position as the Darling family's lawyer, while trying to discover who committed the murder.

In 2008, Thorne starred alongside Christian Slater and Taylor Lautner in the short-lived drama series My Own Worst Enemy, for which she won a Young Artist Award for her portrayal of the character Ruthy Spivey; Thorne described her Enemy casting as a major breakthrough as this was the first recurring role in her career. The same year, she starred in the third-last episode of October Road as Angela Ferilli, the pre-adolescence crush of the main characters. Her older brother Remy also guest-starred in the same episode as a younger Eddie Latekka.

In 2009, she starred in the web series Little Monk, which depicted characters from the series Monk, as Wendy, one of Adrian Monk's classmates. The webisodes are available only on the "Best of Monk" DVD. Also in 2009, she played the role of the vengeful antagonist in the horror film Forget Me Not. Thorne took on a supporting role in the family drama Raspberry Magic, which premiered at the Cinequest Film Festival and the San Francisco International Asian American Film Festival in 2010.

2010–2013: Breakthrough with Disney and music 

In 2010, Thorne replaced Jolean Wejbe as Tancy "Teenie" Henrickson, Bill and Barb Henrickson's younger daughter, in Season 4 of HBO's Big Love. Thorne co-starred on the Disney Channel sitcom Shake It Up, originally titled Dance, Dance Chicago. Thorne played CeCe Jones, a dancer with ambitions for a career in the spotlight despite having dyslexia. The show is a buddy comedy centered on a teen dance show (in a show-within-a-show format) co-starring Thorne and Zendaya. The multi-camera series began production in Hollywood, California, in July 2010 and premiered on November 7, 2010, on Disney Channel. While she had a substantial portfolio of work in television and film, Thorne had no experience in professional dancing before being cast. After signing onto the show in October 2009, she began taking three dance classes every night.

Thorne's first single, "Watch Me" was released on June 21, reaching 86 on the US Billboard Hot 100 charts, 9 on the US Top Heatseekers charts and earning RIAA: Gold. On September 29, 2011, Disney Channel announced it had increased Shake It Ups second season order to 26 episodes. A 90-minute special episode Made In Japan aired August 17, 2012, as the season two finale. On June 4, 2012, Disney Channel announced that Shake It Up had been renewed for a third season. In 2012, Thorne was cast as Avalon Greene in the Disney Channel Original Movie Frenemies. "TTYLXOX" was released on March 6, reaching 97 on the US Billboard Hot 100 charts. On March 30, 2013, it was confirmed by Hollywood Records via Twitter that Thorne had officially signed to the record label.

On July 25, 2013, the Disney Channel confirmed that Shake It Up would be canceled after the end of the third season. On April 23, 2013, Thorne announced her debut album with eleven songs. Thorne spoke about the album, saying "What fans can expect is [for it] just to be very different from anyone because I don't like to be one of those artists where you can be like: 'Oh yeah, I know them from that song.' All my songs are very different from each other. So I don't want to be known as only one genre." Thorne cited Britney Spears, Kesha, and Destiny's Child as influences for the album. In 2013, it was reported that Thorne had signed a new deal to write a series of books, beginning with her first novel, Autumn Falls.

2014–2017: Mainstream film and television
In 2014, Thorne co-starred in the comedy Blended, as Adam Sandler's character's daughter. She also co-starred in the films Alexander and the Terrible, Horrible, No Good, Very Bad Day (2014) and The DUFF (2015), playing high school antagonists. On July 30, Thorne was cast in an episode of the fifteenth season of the CSI: Crime Scene Investigation. The episode, "The Book of Shadows", aired October 19, 2014. Thorne appeared in the sequel to Mostly Ghostly (2008), titled Mostly Ghostly: Have You Met My Ghoulfriend (2014) as Cammy Cahill. On October 15, Thorne revealed her debut album was canceled, saying she wasn't happy with the "auto-tuned bad music" she had in the works. She released an EP, Jersey, on November 17. The lead single from the EP, "Call It Whatever", debuted in the Billboard Hot Dance Club Songs chart at number forty-seven, eventually rising to number ten, spending a total of ten weeks on the chart. Thorne has signed on as one of the leads in Manis Film's thriller Big Sky; Thorne plays Hazel. In 2014, Thorne was cast in the MTV series Scream, which is a television adaptation based on the original slasher film series Scream. Thorne was offered the lead role of the series but felt that the role of the "mean, terrible Nina" would be more iconic. In 2015, Thorne was cast in the animated U.S. dub of the film The Frog Kingdom, portraying the role of Frog Princess. The film was scheduled to be released on video on demand and on DVD beginning on June 30, 2015, by Lionsgate Home Entertainment. On June 1, 2015, it was announced that Thorne would star in the AwesomenessTV film Shovel Buddies, playing the role of Kate. The movie was released on iTunes on October 11, 2016. She also played Jamie, a disillusioned teenager intensely guarding a personal secret, in the film Keep Watching. Also in 2015, she appeared as Ashley, a young and famous singer in Alvin and the Chipmunks: The Road Chip.

In 2016, Thorne played Rain in Tyler Perry's Boo! A Madea Halloween. In 2017, Thorne went back to television with a drama series Famous in Love, airing on Freeform, in which she played Paige Townsen, an ordinary college student who gets her big break after auditioning for the starring role in a Hollywood blockbuster. In March 2017, Thorne joined the cast of the black comedy film, Assassination Nation, which was released in theaters on September 21, 2018. In the same year, Thorne starred in the Netflix original film, You Get Me and made an appearance on Prince Fox's single "Just Call". In October of that year, Thorne appeared in the slasher comedy The Babysitter, directed by McG and released directly to Netflix. She reprised her role in the sequel The Babysitter: Killer Queen.

2018–present: Acting projects, music return and directional debut 

Thorne starred in the romantic drama Midnight Sun, based on the 2006 Japanese film of the same name and released on March 23, 2018. She also contributed five songs to the soundtrack, including the lead single "Burn So Bright" and fan favorite "Walk With Me". The next month, during the Coachella festival, she announced the launch of her own record label called Filthy Fangs. In August 2018, it was revealed that her record label has a partnership deal with Epic/Sony and she began work on her debut studio album titled What Do You See Now?. 

In August 2019, Pornhub announced that Thorne would make her directorial debut on its network. The film, Her & Him, was screened at the Oldenburg Film Festival September 11–20, 2019. In November 2019, Thorne won a Vision Award at the second annual PornHub Awards in Los Angeles for Her & Him. In her acceptance speech, Thorne revealed a partnership with Pornhub to implement a change in the company's flagging algorithm.

In 2020, Thorne competed as "Swan" in the third season of The Masked Singer. She was eliminated on her second appearance. She also starred alongside Jake Manley in the heist-thriller Infamous which was released on June 12, 2020. She received praise for her performance, with critic Nick Allen states that she had "the classically great presence of someone like Sandra Bullock, but with her own scraggly edge ... Thorne dominates numerous scenes that catapult her character from clout-hungry wannabe to gun-selfie superstar."

In August 2020, Thorne joined OnlyFans and became the first person to earn $1 million in the first 24 hours of joining the platform. She earned $2 million in less than a week. Her activities on OnlyFans sparked controversy after she offered $200 pay-per-view photos she claimed were "naked", but the photos were actually of her wearing lingerie, leading to a slew of chargebacks and new restrictions that limited the amount that sex workers on the platform could charge and reduced payouts to creators to monthly rather than weekly. However, OnlyFans denied the changes were related to Thorne. Thorne claimed she created an account as research for a role in an upcoming film with Sean Baker, which Baker denied. She also claimed that money made through the page would be used to fund her production company and distributed to worthy charitable causes.

In November 2020, Thorne starred in the thriller Girl, directed by Chad Faust. The movie itself received mixed reviews but critics entitled this to be Thorne's best performance to date. In the same month she also starred in the action comedy film Chich Fight alongside Malin Akerman and directed by Paul Leyden,

In 2021, Thorne played Lily in season 1 of Amazon Prime Video's Paradise City. She also starred in other projects, such as Masquerade and Time Is Up. In the same year, Thorne starred and served as an executive producer on the film Habit, which is directed by Janell Shirtcliff, Leave Not One Alive opposite Melissa Leo, directed by Jordan Galland, and The Trainer directed by Tony Kaye.

Writing
In addition to her acting and singing careers, Thorne is also a published writer. In 2014, she wrote Autumn Falls, the first in a series of three young adult novels - the other two being Autumn's Kiss (2015) and Autumn's Wish (2016) - about a teenage girl who navigates through the pitfalls of adolescence with help from her diary, which may have links to the supernatural.

In July 2019, Rare Bird Books published The Life of a Wannabe Mogul: Mental Disarray Vol. 1, a book of Thorne's autobiographical poetry.

Media image 

Thorne is recognized for holding a controversial public image. While working on Disney, she stated that she felt restricted, and that "I wish I would have been true to myself," and that "After Disney, I had the opportunity to find my true self and that is reflected in all my work from acting, producing, directing, and writing. I have more artistic freedom to continue to express myself."

Thorne has appeared in over 30 commercials, including Neutrogena and Texas Instruments. Her advertising campaigns include Guess Jeans, Tommy Hilfiger, J.Lo Girls, Candie's, Ralph Lauren, Gap and Diesel. She has been on the magazine covers of US's Shape, Seventeen, Teen Vogue, Latina and Gay Times, UK's Company; Indonesia's Marie Claire and CosmoGirl; Canada's Elle and Mexico's Glamour and GQ. She has appeared in music videos for Liam Payne's "Bedroom Floor", Bhad Bhabie's "Trust Me" and Logan Paul's "Outta My Head".

Thorne is a supporter of the Humane Society, the Cystic Fibrosis Foundation, and The Nomad Organization, which provides education, food and medical supplies to children in Africa. She also joined PETA in encouraging people to boycott and protest SeaWorld, acknowledging that as a child she appeared in a commercial for the theme park.

Personal life
Thorne dated Tristan Klier, then a student, from November 2011 until 2014. She dated English actor Gregg Sulkin from 2015 to August 2016. Shortly after the breakup, she came out as bisexual. In 2017, she dated emo rapper Lil Peep for a short period and was in a relationship with musician Blackbear in August that same year. She had a polyamorous relationship with musician Mod Sun and media personality Tana Mongeau, dating the latter from September 2017 to February 2019 and Mod Sun until April 2019. From April 2019 until 2022, she was in a relationship with Italian singer Benjamin Mascolo, the two announced their engagement in March 2021. However in 2022, the couple officially announced their split.

In July 2019, Thorne said she identifies as pansexual.

In June 2019, Thorne had nude photos stolen by hackers who subsequently threatened her with extortion; she instead released the photographs herself. Later that year, she addressed the issue of pornographic deepfakes.

In a 2021 interview with Bloody Disgusting, Thorne stated that she has been a life-long fan of the horror genre.

Recognition
She was recognized as one of the BBC's 100 women of 2019.

Filmography

Film

 Stuck on You (2003)
 Finishing the Game (2007)
 Blind Ambition (2007)
 The Seer (2007)
 Forget Me Not (2009)
 One Wish (2010)
 Raspberry Magic (2010)
 Katy Perry: Part of Me (2012)
 Underdogs (2013)
 The Frog Kingdom (2013)
 Blended (2014)
 Mostly Ghostly: Have You Met My Ghoulfriend? (2014)
 Alexander and the Terrible, Horrible, No Good, Very Bad Day (2014)
 The Snow Queen 2: The Snow King (2014)
 The DUFF (2015)
 Big Sky (2015)
 Alvin and the Chipmunks: The Road Chip (2015)
 Shovel Buddies (2016)
 Ratchet & Clank (2016)
 Boo! A Madea Halloween (2016)
 Keep Watching (2016)
 You Get Me (2017)
 Amityville: The Awakening (2017)
 The Babysitter (2017)
 Assassination Nation (2018)
 Midnight Sun (2018)
 The Death and Life of John F. Donovan (2018)
 I Still See You (2018)
 Her & Him (2019, director)
 Infamous (2020)
 The Babysitter: Killer Queen (2020)
 Girl (2020)
 Chick Fight (2020)
 Masquerade (2021)
 Time Is Up (2021)
 Habit (2021)
 Measure of Revenge (2022)
 Time Is Up 2 (2022)

Theater

Bibliography
Poetry:
 The Life of a Wannabe Mogul: Mental Disarray (Rare Bird Books, 2019) 

Autumn Falls novels:
 Autumn Falls (Delacorte Press, 2014) 
 Autumn's Kiss (Delacorte Press, 2015) 
 Autumn's Wish (Delacorte Press, 2016)

Discography

Studio albums 

 What Do You See Now? (TBA)

Extended plays 
Made in Japan (2012)
Jersey (2014)

Awards and nominations

References

External links

 
 
 

1997 births
21st-century American actresses
21st-century American novelists
21st-century American women singers
21st-century American women writers
Actresses from Florida
American child actresses
American child singers
American pornographic film directors
American entertainers of Cuban descent
American women pop singers
American film actresses
American television actresses
American video game actresses
American voice actresses
Child pop musicians
American women poets
American young adult novelists
Hispanic and Latino American novelists
Hispanic and Latino American actresses
Hollywood Records artists
LGBT Hispanic and Latino American people
American LGBT musicians
American LGBT actors
LGBT people from Florida
American LGBT writers
Living people
Pansexual actresses
Pansexual musicians
People from Pembroke Pines, Florida
Walt Disney Records artists
BBC 100 Women
American women film directors
Shorty Award winners
21st-century American singers
American women hip hop musicians
American women hip hop singers
OnlyFans creators
Actors with dyslexia